Sausal is a census-designated place in Valencia County, New Mexico, United States. Its population was 1,258 as of the 2010 census.

Geography
Sausal is located at coordinates . According to the United States Census Bureau, Sausal has a total area of 5.91 square kilometers, all land.

Demographics

According to the 2010 census, 1,056 people were living in Sausal. The population density was 178.67 inhabitants per square kilometer. Of the 1,056 inhabitants, Sausal was composed by 79.92% White, 0.38% were African American, 3.31% were Native American, 0.76% were Asian, 0.19% were Pacific Islanders, 11.74% were of other races and 3.69% from two or more races. Of the total population 61.74% were Hispanic or Latino of any race.

Education
Its school district is Belén Consolidated Schools. Belén High School is the district's comprehensive high school.

References

Census-designated places in New Mexico
Census-designated places in Valencia County, New Mexico